Pedro Vuskovic Bravo (February 25, 1924 – May 10, 1993) was a Chilean economist of Croatian descent, political figure, minister and author of the economic plan implemented by Salvador Allende during his government called the Vuskovic plan. His economic policies were used by economists Rudi Dornbusch and Sebastian Edwards to coin the term macroeconomic populism.

Life

Pedro Vuskovic was born in Antofagasta, and obtained a degree in business administration from the Universidad de Chile.  He became a professor of Statistics at the same university, while at the same time working for the CEPAL (United Nations Economic Commission for Latin America and the Caribbean).

Vuskovic joined the ECLAC/FAO in 1950, shortly after its birth as an institution. For nearly 20 years he worked there, with his career in ECLAC culminating in the position of Director of the Development Division, where he played a role in structuring and disseminating the thinking of ECLAC.  Concurrently, he served as a professor in ECLAC and ILPES training programmes while at the same time teaching classes at the schools of economics and sociology at the University of Chile and the School of Economics at the University of Concepción, finally becoming the Director of the Institute of Economics of the University of Chile.

He was the author of the economic platform of the Popular Unity (UP) campaign, and on November 3, 1970, he was named Minister of Economic Affairs by President Salvador Allende. He became the key figure in the economic policy of the UP government, and tried to implement a massive redistribution of revenue (see Vuskovic plan) by raising salaries and increasing public expenditure, through which he believed that the buying power of the population would increase and accordingly consumption in general.

He remained as a minister until June 17, 1972, when political pressure forced President Allende to halt his economic plans and replace him in the cabinet. Vuskovic then took over the cabinet-level position of Executive Vice President of the Production Development Corporation (CORFO), where he served until September 1973. After the Chilean Coup of 1973, he was exiled to Mexico.

There he became a professor, first at the Economic Research and Teaching Centre (CIDE), where he directed the Institute of Economic Studies of Latin America, and later at the Centre for Interdisciplinary Research in the Humanities at the National University of Mexico (UNAM), where he was named to the position of Coordinator for a programme on poverty and development options in various countries of Latin America.

After the return to democracy in 1990, he returned to Chile for a short while but moved back to Mexico where he lived his last years and died in 1993.

Additional information

See also

History of Chile
Chile under Allende
Salvador Allende
Vuskovic plan

Bibliography

 Vuskovic, Pedro; Acusación al imperialismo, Fondo de Cultura Económica, México D.F., 1975

Sources

 In memoriam  
 Brief biographical overview 
 Bibliography, 1973–93 
 Short overview of UP's political and economic policy

1924 births
1993 deaths
Chilean exiles
Chilean socialists
Presidency of Salvador Allende
Chilean people of Croatian descent
Chilean Ministers of Economy
People from Antofagasta
20th-century  Chilean economists